The Uses of Enchantment: The Meaning and Importance of Fairy Tales is a 1976 book by Bruno Bettelheim, in which the author analyzes fairy tales in terms of Freudian psychoanalysis.  The book has been a subject of controversy regarding possible plagiarism.

Structure and contents
The book is divided into two main sections. The first, "A Pocketful of Magic," outlines Bettelheim's thoughts on the value of fairy tales for children. The second part, "In Fairy Land," presents psychoanalytical readings of several popular fairy tales, specifically:
"Hansel and Gretel"
"Little Red Riding Hood"
"Jack and the Beanstalk"
"Snow White"
"Goldilocks and the Three Bears"
"The Sleeping Beauty"
"Cinderella"
The "animal bridegroom" cycle of fairy tales, including "Beauty and the Beast", "The Frog Prince" and "Bluebeard".

Bettelheim presents a case that fairy tales help children solve certain existential problems such as separation anxiety, oedipal conflict, and sibling rivalries.  The extreme violence and ugly emotions of many fairy tales serve to deflect what may well be going on in the child's mind anyway.  A child's unrealistic fears often require unrealistic hopes.  And furthermore, "The Frog King" may be superior to modern sex education in that it acknowledges that a child may find sex disgusting, and this may serve a protective function for the child.

In his introduction, Bettelheim stated that he was writing the book as "an educator and therapist of severely disturbed children."
However, after his death, his credentials in those fields were found to be faked, and Bettelheim had only taken three introductory classes in psychology.

Reception and influence
In the U.S., Bettelheim and The Uses of Enchantment won the 1976 National Book Critics Circle Award for Criticism and the 1977 National Book Award in category Contemporary Thought.

Robert A. Segal writes, "It is the disjunction between Bettelheim's up-to-date approach to fairy tales and his old-fashioned approach to myths that is striking."

The Uses of Enchantment has been cited as an influence in many subsequent works that utilize fairy tales in adult terms, including the 1987 film Dolls, the 2011 Catherine Hardwicke film Red Riding Hood and the 2014 fantasy horror film Red Kingdom Rising.

Plagiarism

In the Winter 1991 edition of the peer-reviewed Journal of American Folklore, Alan Dundes, then a 28-year veteran in the anthropology department at the University of California, Berkeley, presented a case that Bettelheim had copied key passages from A Psychiatric Study of Myths and Fairy Tales: Their Origin, Meaning, and Usefulness (1963, 1974 rev. ed.) by Julius Heuscher without giving appropriate credit, as well as unacknowledged borrowing from other sources.

Dundes states that Bettelheim engaged in "wholesale borrowing" of both "random passages" and "key ideas," primarily from Heuscher's book, but also from other sources.  Robert A. Georges, a professor of folklore at UCLA, states "it is clear he [Bettelheim] didn't do his homework."

Heuscher himself did not consider it a big deal.  He said, "We all plagiarize. I plagiarize. Many times, I am not sure whether it came out of my own brain or if it came from somewhere else … I'm only happy that I would have influenced Bruno Bettelheim. I did not always agree with him. But that does not matter. Poor Bruno Bettelheim. I would not want to disturb his eternal sleep with this [Ellipsis in Los Angeles Times article]."

Dundes also states that his own 1967 article on Cinderella was copied by Bettelheim. Jacquelyn Sanders, who knew Bettelheim and later served the same position as director of the Orthogenic School at the University of Chicago, said she did not believe many people would agree with Dundes's accusations. She stated in 1991, "I would not call that plagiarism. I think the article is a reasonable scholarly endeavor, and calling it scholarly etiquette is appropriate. It is appropriate that this man deserved to be acknowledged and Bettelheim didn't … But I would not fail a student for doing that, and I don't know anybody who would [Ellipses in Chicago Tribune article]."

In reviewing a biography of Bettelheim by Richard Pollak in 1997, Sarah Boxer of the New York Times wrote, "Mr. Pollak gives a damning passage-for-passage comparison of the two [Heuscher's 1963 book and Bettelheim's 1976 book]."

And as early as 1991, the Los Angeles Times compared what Heuscher had written: "While one must never ‘explain’ the fairy tales to the child, the narrator’s understanding of their meaning is very important. It furthers the sensitivity for selecting those stories which are most appropriate in various phases of children’s development and for stressing those themes which may be therapeutic for specific psychological difficulties."

And what Bettelheim later wrote: "One must never ‘explain’ to the child the meaning of fairy tales. However, the narrator’s understanding of the fairy tale’s message to the child’s preconscious mind is important. . . . It furthers the adult’s sensitivity to selection of those stories which are most appropriate to the child’s state of development and to the specific psychological difficulties he is confronted with at the moment [Ellipsis in Los Angeles Times article]."

References

1976 non-fiction books
American non-fiction books
Books about psychoanalysis
Books by Bruno Bettelheim
Books involved in plagiarism controversies
Books of literary criticism
National Book Award-winning works
National Book Critics Circle Award-winning works
Psychoanalytic books
Works about fairy tales
Thames & Hudson books